Weilmünster is a municipality in Limburg-Weilburg district in Hesse, Germany.

Geography 
Weilmünster is among the most richly wooded places in Limburg-Weilburg. The forestry office looks after not only the State Forest but also twelve municipalities’ woodlands in the south of the Limburg-Weilburg and Lahn-Dill districts.

Location 
The market community of Weilmünster lies on the north slope of the Taunus in the Weil valley, the Weil being a tributary to the Lahn. The nearest major cities are Wetzlar (20 km) to the northeast, Limburg (25 km) to the west and Frankfurt am Main (50 km) to the southeast.

Neighbouring communities 
Weilmünster borders in the north on the towns of Weilburg (Limburg-Weilburg) and Braunfels, in the east on the community of Waldsolms (both in the Lahn-Dill-Kreis), in the south on the communities of Grävenwiesbach, Weilrod (both in the Hochtaunuskreis) and Selters and in the west on the communities of Villmar and Weinbach (all three in Limburg-Weilburg).

Constituent communities 
Weilmünster's main centre, also called Weilmünster, is the biggest of the constituent communities in this community of roughly 10,000 inhabitants, to which a further eleven centres belong. The other Ortsteile are named Audenschmiede, Aulenhausen, Dietenhausen, Ernsthausen, Essershausen, Laimbach, Langenbach, Laubuseschbach, Lützendorf, Möttau, Rohnstadt and Wolfenhausen. Until about 150 years ago, Heinzenberg, which now belongs to Grävenwiesbach, was also one of Weilmünster's constituent communities.

History 
In 1217, Weilmünster had its first documentary mention as Wilmunstre. It was, however, by this time already a sizeable village with its own church. History hints that the Fulda Monastery, which had holdings in the village, had this church built sometime in the 9th century. The church that stands today was built in the early 16th century, and its square defensive tower sometime around 1300. As of 1601, a regular market is known to have been being held in Weilmünster. The community belonged to Nassau, and after the division of inheritance to Nassau-Weilburg. From 1806 it belonged to the Duchy of Nassau. In 1866 it passed to Prussia, becoming part of the Province of Hesse-Nassau.

Industrialization began early. In the early 16th century there was an ironworks with a blast furnace in Weilmünster. Later came foundries and other metalworking businesses. This industrial development, however, was short-lived. While the road through the Lahn valley was expanded and the Lahn was channelled, Weilmünster, which lay off these arteries, fell behind. The building of the Weilstraße (“Weil Road”) in 1860 came too late, and the railway only reached Weilmünster in 1908.

In 1421, there was a forest smithy in Audenschmiede. It developed itself into a nationally important smithy that, in 1798 passed into the ownership of the Buderus firm when it was founded, and until 1930 it was one of the firm's most important locations.

During Nazi Germany, the mentally ill and handicapped of the 1897 Landesheil- und Pflegeanstalt Weilmünster  were forcibly sterilized and systematically underfed or killed with drug overdoses. From 1937 to 1945, more than 6,000 people died there, among them all Jewish patients. Preliminary proceedings against the facility's staff for having taken part in the Nazi murder of the sick were suspended in 1953.

The old community of Weilmünster in the former district of the Oberlahnkreis was merged in the 1970s with other communities into the greater community of Weilmünster.

Of today's constituent communities, Möttau had its first documentary mention in 802, Laubuseschbach in 897, Wolfenhausen in 1194, Essershausen in 1233, Lützendorf in 1234, Dietenhausen in 1301, Ernsthausen in 1309, Laimbach in 1344, Langenbach in 1335, Rohnstadt in 1355 and Aulenhausen in 1565.

Politics 

The municipal election held on 26 March 2006 yielded the following results:

Elections 2016:
CDU: 10
SPD: 11
BL: 6
BfW: 4

Mayors 
Faust, Andreas  1835–1874
Eppstein, Johann Christian  1867–1875, 1876–1880, 1880–1891
Dienst, Philipp Friedrich  1891–1896
Eppstein, Philipp  1896–1900
Klein, Philipp Heinrich  1900–1926
Müller, August 1926 – 1933
Färber, August 1933 – 1941
Weil, Hermann  1941–1945
Weil, Albert  1945
Metzler, Adolf  1945–1946
Weil, Albert  1946–1948
Weinbrenner, Friedrich  1948 (first deputy)
Benz, Albert  1948–1951
Dr. Kottek  1951–1952 (first deputy)
Benz, Wilhelm  1952–1958
Windmeier, Waldemar  1958–1988
Pfeiffer, Klaus  1988–1994
Heep, Manfred  1994–2018
Koschel, Mario since 2018

Coat of arms 
The community's arms in their current form were conferred on 1 July 1935 by the Chief President (Oberpräsident) of the Province of Hesse-Nassau and on 30 September 1983 they were confirmed by the Hessian Minister of the Interior. At the same time, through a separate document, the community of Weilmünster (Oberlahnkreis) was granted the right to bear the title Marktflecken (“Market Community”).

The church in the arms is modelled on the Weilmünster Evangelical church. The golden lion with the seven billets was the coat of arms borne by the former Duchy of Nassau. It is known that today's arms were already borne shortly after the Thirty Years' War as an official seal.

Flag 
The community's flag has two coloured stripes in orange and blue, alternating at a point one third the way down the flag, which has the proportions 5:2. The point where the colours alternate is overlaid with the community's coat of arms. The colours recall the colours flown by the former Duchy of Nassau.

Town partnerships 
 Le Cheylard, Ardèche, France since 1963.

Since 1963 the market town Weilmünster is associated with the southern French municipality of Le Cheylard. 
However, the first contacts between representatives of both municipalities go back till 1959.
At that time many towns and municipalities tried to make a contribution to the reconciliation with the former war opponent of France in which they closed partnerships with French municipalities. Weilmünster elected Le Cheylard in the north of the department Ardeche in the Central Massif. This provincial town is situated at the mouth of the Thorne in the Eyrieux, a tributary of the Rhone, about 60 km to the west of Valence. 
After the union celebrations in 1963 a regular exchange of groups of schoolchildren took place. Choirs, sports teams and official delegations from both municipalities visited the respective twin town. The people get a look received insight into the normal life of the families of the country in the neighbourhood. This led to numerous private friendships between the families. Only this can protect the continuity of town twinning. 
After more than 40 years of partnership, it only stays alive, the union was confirmed and renewed since 1963 first in 5/30/2003 in Le Cheylard and in 5/21/2004 in Weilmünster with big participation of the population in attractive ceremonies. 
The official local committees can support and promote, but the partnership remains vividly only if many citizens are interested in our twin town in future.

Culture and sightseeing
Old Nassau Amtshaus
Evangelical church with Wehrturm (“Defence Tower”)
Timber-frame houses
"Kirbergturm" (lookout tower) - suggested as UNESCO world heritage in 2022

Economy and infrastructure

Transport 
Weilmünster lies on Bundesstraße 456 on which Weilburg and Bad Homburg vor der Höhe can be reached. The distance to Frankfurt Airport is roughly 60 km.

The Weiltalbahn, the former railway line from Weilburg to Grävenwiesbach (and on to Frankfurt) led through Weilmünster. Besides the railway station itself, the resort institution had its own halt. Within the community, a spur branched off this line to Laubuseschbach.

Since then, all the tracks have been torn up without a trace, and the railway's right-of-way has in great parts been used to build the Weil Valley Bicycle Path. The spur line, too, can now be used by hikers, cyclists or inline skaters. In Weilmünster, the last witnesses to the railway are the old station building and the walled-up tunnel portals. The stone arches of the viaduct stood until August 2007 when they had to give way to a road-widening project.

Within the framework of the reactivation of the Grävenwiesbach-Brandoberndorf railway line, a new connection to the rail network was considered for Weilmünster; however, there was no concrete followup to these plans.

Business 
The Weilmünster Clinic is, with 680 staff, the greater community's biggest employer. The second biggest is the car supplier Reum in Audenschmiede. There are many family businesses here. There are a roadbuilding company, a furniture shop and a great number of small businesses and handicraft enterprises. Weilmünster's main centre supplies medical, shopping and school services, and it is also there that the community nursing station and the local history parlour can be found.

Education 
Weilmünster is home to a primary school which serves as a “midpoint school”, a coöperative comprehensive school with Hauptschule, Realschule and Gymnasium branches with years 5 to 9. Students from Weilmünster attend higher schools in Weilburg.

Public institutions 
 Weilmünster Volunteer Fire Brigade, founded 1910 (includes youth fire brigade)
 Aulenhausen Volunteer Fire Brigade, founded 1934 (includes youth fire brigade)
 Dietenhausen Volunteer Fire Brigade, founded 1934 (includes youth fire brigade)
 Ernsthausen Volunteer Fire Brigade, founded 1932 (includes youth fire brigade)
 Essershausen Volunteer Fire Brigade, founded 1934
 Laimbach Volunteer Fire Brigade, founded 1934 (includes youth fire brigade)
 Langenbach Volunteer Fire Brigade, founded 1934 (includes youth fire brigade)
 Laubuseschbach Volunteer Fire Brigade, founded 1934 (includes youth fire brigade)
 Rohnstadt Volunteer Fire Brigade, founded 1934 (includes youth fire brigade)
 Wolfenhausen Volunteer Fire Brigade, founded 1932 (includes youth fire brigade)

Regular events 
Weilmünster has held market rights for more than 400 years and makes lively use of trade and market even today. People still flock to the community's three yearly markets, the Frühlingsmarkt (“Spring Market”, held in March), the Bauernmarkt (“Farmers’ Market”) and the Martinimarkt.

Moreover, sporting events such as the Weiltal-Marathon in April, and the autofreie Weiltal (“carfree Weil valley”, held on a Sunday in August) keep drawing visitors to the community, as is also the case with the Weiltalweg and the new recreational vehicle campsite. Other events include:
the Weiltal-Familien-Radtour (cycling tour) in collaboration with the Weilmünster Transport and Beautification Club, in June;
the Apfellauf (“Apple Walk”) in collaboration with the Kelterei Heil (wine pressing workshop), in July;
the Weinfest, also in July;
Kirmes (with farmers’ market), in September;
the Martinimarkt Weilmünster, in November.

Sons and daughters of the place 

 Wilhelm Franz (1864–1948), architect and university lecturer, city architect, builder of the Dillingen town hall
 Ernst Schiele (1865–1933), born in Audenschmiede, industrialist and parliamentarian
 Ernst Loew (1911–1988), Member of Parliament 
 Reinhold Staudt (1928–1978), politician (SPD)

Sources 

Erco von Dietze: Archiv Evangelische Kirchengemeinde Weilmünster I. 1565–1975. Findbuch. 1989
Erco von Dietze: Archiv Evangelische Kirchengemeinde Weilmünster II. (Ernsthausen) 1766–1976. Findbuch. 1989

External links 
 

Oil campaign of World War II
Limburg-Weilburg